Reginald II of Bar ( or ) (died 25 July 1170) was a Count of Bar and Lord of Mousson from 1149 till his death. He was the son of Reginald I, Count of Bar and lord of Mousson, and Giselle of Vaudémont.

In 1135, he attended the Council of Hugh of Metz with his father and brother. He took part in the second crusade with his father and brother Theodoric in 1147. His father died during his return. He reestablished wars against his traditional enemies, the Duke of Lorraine and the bishop of Metz.

He was attacked in 1152, escaped to the Abbey of Saint-Mihiel and was excommunicated. After that, Reginald had to make amends to have his excommunication lifted. In 1170, Reginald died, to be succeeded by his eldest son, Henry, as Count of Bar and Lord of Mousson.

Marriage and children 
He was married in 1155 to Agnes of Champagne (died 1207), daughter of Theobald II (IV), Count of Blois and Champagne and Matilda of Carinthia, and had the following issue:
 Henry I (1158–1190), Count of Bar
 Theobald I (1159 or 1161 – 1214), Count of Bar
 Reginald († 1217), bishop of Chartres (1182–1217)
 Hugh, canon in Chartres

References

House of Montbelliard
Renaut II
Lords of Mousson
People temporarily excommunicated by the Catholic Church
Renaut II
1170 deaths
Year of birth unknown